Shah Abbas is the name of:

Abbas I of Persia (1571–1629), Shah (king) of Iran, and the most powerful ruler of the Safavid dynasty
Abbas II of Persia (1633–1666), Shah (king) of Iran, son of Shah Safi
Abbas III of Persia (1732–1740), Shah (king) of Iran, son of Shah Tahmasb II